Tavşan Adası ("Rabbit Island" in Turkish) (Greek: Neandros (Νέανδρος), the name of a mythological figure.) or Balıkçı Adası is the smallest of the Princes' Islands in the Sea of Marmara, to the southeast of Istanbul, Turkey. It is under the administration of the Adalar (literally Islands or Isles) district of Istanbul Province.

See also 
 List of islands of Turkey

Islands of the Sea of Marmara
Islands of Turkey
Neighbourhoods of Adalar, Istanbul
Islands of Istanbul Province